Penang Chinese Girls' Private High School is a private high school in Penang, Malaysia. It is one of the Chinese independent high schools in Malaysia. It offers a 6-year course that allow students to take either an internationally recognised examination, the UEC, or the Malaysian government exam, PMR and SPM.

History
Hokkien immigrants from China built Penang Fukian Girls' High School in 1919. In 1920, there were 52 students. After several changes of location due to the increase of students, the school was forced to a temporal hiatus in 1941 because of the Second World War. It resumed teaching in 1945. It was finally named Penang Chinese Girls' High School in 1951. In 1962, Penang Chinese Girls' High School accepted the change of systems to publicly funded. The Chinese-based private school was kept under a different name, thus Penang Chinese Girls' Private High School. This school used to accept boys, now no more.

References

Secondary schools in Malaysia
Chinese-language schools in Malaysia